5 de chocolate y 1 de fresa ("5 Chocolate and 1 Strawberry Icecreams") is a 1968 Mexican comedy film.  The story involves a student at a convent who undergoes a radical transformation after consuming strange "mushrooms".

External links
 

1968 films
1960s Spanish-language films

Mexican comedy films
1968 comedy films
1960s Mexican films